The Chief of the Air Staff (India), known also as the Air Force Chief, has been the title of the professional head of the Indian Air Force since 1950. The CAS is a statutory position in the Indian Armed Forces held by the most senior officer of the Air Force, and is usually the highest ranking air officer of the Indian Armed Forces unless the Chief of Defence Staff is an officer of the aerial branch. 

The current CAS is Air Chief Marshal Vivek Ram Chaudhari who took office on 30 September 2021, following the retirement of Air Chief Marshal Rakesh Kumar Singh Bhadauria.

Office of the Chief of the Air Staff
At Independence, the head of the Air Force  designated as the "Air Marshal Commanding, Royal Indian Air Force". On 1 March 1948, the title of "Chief of the Air Staff" was added, with a further re-designation to "Chief of the Air Staff and Commander-in-Chief, Royal Indian Air Force" on 21 June to maintain uniformity across the three armed services.

The "Royal" designation was dropped when India became a republic on 26 January 1950. Thus re-designating the head of IAF to "Chief of the Air Staff and Commander-in-Chief, Indian Air Force". 

The Commanders-In-Chief (Change in Designation) Act, 1955  re-designated the head of IAF to "Chief of the Air Staff". The position was held by a three-star ranked Air Marshal until 1966, when the position was upgraded to the four-star rank of an Air Chief Marshal. 

Appointments to the office are made by the Appointments Committee of the Cabinet (ACC). The CAS reaches superannuation upon three years in the office or at the age of 62, whichever is earlier.

Appointees
 

(**Seconded from the Royal Air Force)

Air Marshal Commanding, Royal Indian Air Force (1947–1948)

Chief of the Air Staff and Commander-in-Chief, Royal Indian Air Force (1948–1950)

Chief of the Air Staff and Commander-in-Chief, Indian Air Force (1950–1955)

Chief of the Air Staff (1955–present)

See also
 Vice Chief of the Air Staff
 Chief of the Army Staff
 Chief of the Naval Staff
 Chief of Defence Staff
 Chairman of the Chiefs of Staff Committee
 Chief of Integrated Defence Staff
 Chief of the General Staff
 Commander-in-Chief of India
 List of serving air marshals of the Indian Air Force

Notes

References

Chiefs of the Indian Air Force

External links
 

 
India
Indian military appointments
Indian Air Force appointments